Pandit Ramarao Patra (born 1947) is an Odissi music Guru, Odissi Bina exponent or Binākāra (also spelled Veena), noted composer & vocalist. He has composed music for hundreds of Odissi dance items and has worked closely with the founding Gurus of Odissi dance including Guru Pankaj Charan Das, Guru Deba Prasad Das & Guru Kelucharan Mahapatra. He has widely performed Odissi Bina recitals across the state. He presently teaches Odissi Veena to students at Guru Ramhari Das' Odissi Gurukul at Biragobindapur, Puri, Odisha. Patra is the very last Guru and artiste of the Odissi Veena.Patra started his initial training at the age of six in the Gandhiji Sangita Kalamandira established by Acharya Tarini Charan Patra in his hometown. He initially trained under Guru Bauribandhu Das and Guru Krusna Chandra Brahma. He then learned vocal Odissi music and the intricacies of the Bina in the Odissi style of music from Tarini Charan Patra himself. He later joined the Utkal Sangeet Mahavidyalaya as a student and continued his musical education there.

References

External links 
Website of Guru Ramahari Das Odissi Gurukul

Odissi music
1947 births
Living people
People from Ganjam district
Recipients of the Odisha Sangeet Natak Akademi award